Afraflacilla braunsi is a jumping spider species in the genus Afraflacilla that lives in South Africa, Saudi Arabia, Yemen, United Arab Emirates and Turkmenistan.

References 

Taxa described in 1903
Fauna of South Africa
Fauna of Saudi Arabia
Fauna of Yemen
Fauna of Turkmenistan
Salticidae